The Bank of Jordan is a bank in Jordan, where it is the second largest  financial institute. It was founded in 1960 and is based in Amman. The Bank of Jordan offers credit cards and Internet banking. It operates over 100 bank branches in Jordan and 12 branches in the West Bank and Gaza Strip areas, and over 150 automated teller machines.

The bank's stock is listed on the Amman Stock Exchange's ASE Weighted Index.

References

External links

Bank of Jordan official website in Arabic and English

1960 establishments in Jordan
Banks established in 1960
Companies based in Amman
Banks of Jordan
Companies listed on the Amman Stock Exchange